Mikael Oskarsson is a Swedish comic creator who has worked in various genres in both fanzine and professional contexts. His semi-pornographic superhero adventure, The Exhibitionist, was published in the United States at Fantagraphics under their sub-label Eros Comix.

References 

Swedish cartoonists
Living people
Year of birth missing (living people)